Garry is an Irish surname.  It is a reduced Anglicized form of McGarry or O’Gara.  Notable people with the surname include:

Ben Garry (1956–2006), American football player
Chief Garry ( 1811–1892), Native American leader of the Middle Spokane tribe
Charles Garry (1909–1991), American civil rights attorney
Colleen Garry (born 1962), American politician
Flora Garry (1900–2000), Scottish poet
Jim Garry (1869–1917), American baseball player
Robert Campbell Garry (1900–1993) Scottish physician
Ryan Garry (born 1983), English footballer
Ted Garry (born 1885), Scottish footballer
Vivien Garry (died 2008), American jazz bassist

Anglicised Irish-language surnames